Vaďovce is a village and municipality in Nové Mesto nad Váhom District in the Trenčín Region of western Slovakia between Biele and Male Karpaty.

History
In historical records the village was first mentioned in 1392
Vaďovce has been a holiday centre for many years. There is an old church with ancient ornaments on the walls. Overall, Vaďovce has been not been well known but in recent years awareness has grown. The current mayor of Vaďovce is Alžbeta Tuková. The patriot Michal Cibulka was born in this village and Ján Krasko Zápotocký had been officiating here.  He is an active Slovak patriot who had collected and edited folk songs for piano and choir.

Geography
The municipality lies at an altitude of 228 metres and covers an area of 11.114 km². It has a population of about 686 people.

References

External links

  Official page
http://www.statistics.sk/mosmis/eng/run.html

Villages and municipalities in Nové Mesto nad Váhom District